Thelairodoria setinervis is a species of bristle fly in the family Tachinidae.

Species
United States.

References

Insects described in 1910
Diptera of North America
Exoristinae
Taxa named by Daniel William Coquillett